Helastia triphragma is a moth of the family Geometridae. This species is endemic to New Zealand. It was first described by Edward Meyrick in 1883 and originally named Cidaria triphragma.

References

Moths of New Zealand
Endemic fauna of New Zealand
Moths described in 1883
Taxa named by Edward Meyrick
Cidariini
Endemic moths of New Zealand